Anna Tatishvili was the defending champion, but lost in the first round to Bernarda Pera.

Irina Falconi won the title, defeating Jennifer Brady in the final, 7–6(7–3), 6–2.

Seeds

Main draw

Finals

Top half

Bottom half

References 
 Main draw

John Newcombe Women's Pro Challenge - Singles